Nikola Milojević (born 16 April 1981) is a Serbian retired professional footballer who played as a goalkeeper.

Milojević made a name for himself at Hajduk Kula, before moving to Vitória Setúbal in the summer of 2006. He also played for Borac Čačak and Smederevo after returning to his homeland.

At international level, Milojević won the silver medal at the 2004 UEFA Under-21 Championship. He also represented Serbia and Montenegro at the 2004 Summer Olympics.

Honours
Vitória Setúbal
 Taça da Liga: 2007–08

Borac Čačak
 Serbian Cup: Runner-up 2011–12

External links
 
 
 

Association football goalkeepers
Expatriate footballers in Portugal
FK Bane players
FK Borac Čačak players
FK Hajduk Kula players
FK Smederevo players
FK Zemun players
Footballers at the 2004 Summer Olympics
OFK Mladenovac players
Olympic footballers of Serbia and Montenegro
Primeira Liga players
Serbia and Montenegro under-21 international footballers
Serbian expatriate footballers
Serbian expatriate sportspeople in Portugal
Serbian footballers
Serbian SuperLiga players
Vitória F.C. players
1981 births
Living people